CityBird was an airline founded in 1996, and based in Building 117D, Melsbroek Airport in Zaventem. The airline filed for bankruptcy in October 2001. Thomas Cook Airlines Belgium considered buying them out of bankruptcy, but later pulled out.

They flew a fleet of twelve aircraft including the Boeing 767-300ER, various Boeing 737 models (series -300, -400 and -800 aircraft), the Airbus A300-600R and the McDonnell Douglas MD-11. Over 50 European cities were served via Brussels. Citybird employed over 600 employees as of 2001 and was listed at NASDAQ Europe a.k.a. Eastdaq under the ticker symbol CBIR (CityBird holding SA) in November 1997. Though they had bought their first MD-11 in December 1996, they did not begin operations until March 1997.

Their planes offered a "Royal Eagle" business class, "Premium Flamingo" class (not on Newark flights), and "Colibri" economy class.  They used the "point-to-point" approach to air travel rather than the "hub and spoke" wherein all transatlantic flights (from Los Angeles, Newark, Oakland, Miami, Orlando or Mexico City) went to Brussels Airport (BRU).  All aircraft featured the airline's tagline, "The Flying Dream."

In July 1999, CityBird began cargo activities using two A300-600 "full freighters."

Destinations in the western hemisphere

According to the airline's timetable covers, the following destinations in the western hemisphere were served by CityBird from its hub in Brussels:

North America

Cuba
Varadero
Mexico
Cancun
Mexico City
United States
Las Vegas
Los Angeles
Miami
New York City (served via the Newark Liberty International Airport)
Oakland (San Francisco was served via the Oakland International Airport)
Orlando

South America
Suriname
Paramaribo

CityBird also served over 50 destinations in Europe from its Brussels hub.

Fleet

 Two Airbus A300-600R
 One Boeing 737-300
 Four Boeing 737-400
 Three Boeing 737-800
 Two Boeing 767-300ER
 Three McDonnell Douglas MD-11

References

External links

CityBird (Archive)
Airlines Remembered

Defunct airlines of Belgium
Airlines established in 1996
Airlines disestablished in 2001
Zaventem
Belgian companies established in 1996
2001 disestablishments in Belgium